Smail Hamdani (11 March 1930 – 6/7 February 2017) was an Algerian politician. He was Prime Minister of Algeria from 15 December 1998 to 23 December 1999.

Early life and education
Hamdani was born in Guenzet, Bordj Bou Arréridj Province in eastern Algeria, on 11 March 1930.

Political career
Hamdani became a member of the National Liberation Front (FLN). In 1962 when Algeria gained its independence, he was named as chief of staff of the provisional government led by Abderrahmane Farès. Under the presidency of Ahmed Ben Bella, Hamdani was appointed ambassador to Belgium. Then he served as information officer and the director of legal and consular affairs at the Ministry of Foreign Affairs until 1970.

He was Prime Minister from 15 December 1998 to 23 December 1999.

Death 
Hamdani died in his sleep on the night of 6 February or the morning of 7 February 2017 at the age of 86.

See also
List of ambassadors to Belgium
List of ambassadors to France

References

1930 births
2017 deaths
Ambassadors of Algeria to Belgium
Ambassadors of Algeria to France
21st-century Algerian people